The North Winnipeg Satelites are a junior "B" ice hockey team based in Winnipeg, Manitoba. They are members of the Capital Region Junior Hockey League (CRJHL).

History 
Founded in 1980, the North Winnipeg Satelites found much success early on winning the league title five times (1983, 1985, 1986, 1988, 1989) in the 80s. The Satelites went on to capture the Baldy Northcott Trophy four of five times. They would repeat the feat again in 2006. They would also finish in third place at the Keystone Cup in 1988 hosted in  Saskatoon. 

The team was a member of the Keystone Junior Hockey League until 2018. For the 2018-19 season the Satellites were one of five teams that departed the Keystone Junior Hockey League to establish the Capital Region Junior Hockey League.

Season-by-season record

Note: GP = Games played, W = Wins, L = Losses, T = Ties, OTL = Overtime Losses, Pts = Points, GF = Goals for, GA = Goals against

Keystone Cup
Western Canadian Jr. B Championships (Northern Ontario to British Columbia)Six teams in round-robin play. 1st vs. 2nd for gold/silver & 3rd vs. 4th for bronze.

References

External links 

 North Winnipeg Satelites official website
Ice hockey teams in Winnipeg